The 1917 North Carolina A&M Aggies football team was an American football team that represented North Carolina College of Agriculture and Mechanic Arts (later renamed North Carolina State University) during the 1917 college football season.  In Harry Hartsell's first season (and first stint, as he would leave and then return for the 1921–1923 seasons), the coach managed to garner a winning record for the Aggies for the first time since the 1913 SAIAA champion team, and tied the record for most wins in a season at 6 (other 6-win seasons as of 1917 were 1907–09, and 1913).

Schedule

References

North Carolina AandM
NC State Wolfpack football seasons
North Carolina AandM Aggies football